The second season  of So You Think You Can Dance in the Benelux aired in fall of 2009.   It followed an initial production in the Netherlands in 2008, with the second season now expanding in scope to include Belgium.  Dutch channel RTL4 continued to broadcast the show in the Netherlands, while Belgian station VTM was the Flemish broadcaster.  With the departure of the first season's host, singer EliZe, the presentation duties for the show fell to new co-hosts An Lemmens and Dennis Weening, who have remained with the production for its subsequent three seasons.  The second season premiered on September 1, 2009 and concluded eight weeks later on November 29, with Belgian Els Smekens announced winner in a live finale.  Smekens won a choice of dance school opportunities in the U.S., a cash prize of €20,000, and a dance solo in the musical Hairspray.

Judge panel

Unlike the first season, the second season featured a less permanent make-up for the Judge panel with Dan Karaty, Jan Kooijman and Nicky VerNew with one being occasionally replaced for a week by a guest judge.

Auditions and Bootcamp

Initial open auditions were held over two days in Antwerp, with highlights broadcast as the first four episodes of the season.  Of the initial auditioners, 120 were selected to progress to a group choreography round in Amsterdam.  From this pool, 30 dancers were selected to participate in an intensive series of workshops known as "Bootcamp."  The bootcamp for the second season was held in Los Angeles and featured choreographers Travis Payne, Timor Steffens and Kherington Payne, a former contestant on the original American series.  From these competitors the judges ultimately chose the Top 18 dancers who would perform in the main competitions, or "Live Shows."

Live Shows

From the Top 18 to the Top 10, the bottom three couples, based on each week's vote, would be in danger of elimination from the competition and would be required to "Dance for their lives" (perform a solo) to avoid being the one of the two dancers dismissed.  From the Top Ten to the finale, dancers received votes as individuals and not couples and eliminations were determined solely by home viewer votes.

Male Dancers

Female Dancers

 Suurmeijer replaced original Top 18 finalist Ine Vanbesien after she had to voluntarily withdrawal from the competition.   Suurmeijer herself had almost made the Top 18 originally, but had to withdrawal from Bootcamp early due to an injury which was healed by the live shows, allowing her to step in for Vanbesien.   Suurmeijer then suffered another injury during rehearsals for the third week of the live shows, leading to her withdrawal as well, allowing contestant Saartje Van de Casteele  (eliminated in week 2) to return.

Elimination Chart 

† Suurmeijer replaced original Top 18 finalist Ine Vanbesien after she had to voluntarily withdrawal from the competition.   Suurmeijer herself had almost made the Top 18 originally, but had to withdrawal from Bootcamp early due to an injury which was healed by the live shows, allowing her to step in for Vanbesien.

‡ During the performance of the first week's live routine, Velzen Bottazi was injured and could not proceed further in the competition.  Remy Tilburg assumed his position the following week. Lorenzo van Velzen Bottazzi deed weer mee tijdens seizoen 3.

¦ Suurmeijer suffered another injury during rehearsals for the third week of the live shows, leading to her withdrawal as well, allowing contestant Saartje Van de Casteele  (eliminated in week 2) to return.

Live Show 1 (October 11, 2009)
Judge panel: Jan Kooijman, Nicky VerNew, Dan Karaty

Results Show 1
Group Choreography:"Fame"—Naturi Naughton (hip-Hop, choreography by Roy Julen)
Dance for your life couples:
 Pablo & Saartje (Pablo eliminated)
 Bruno & Noi
 Michael & Rubiën (Rubiën eliminated)
Solo's:
 Saartje: Only You - Ashanti
 Pablo: Unknown
 Noi: Unknown
 Bruno: Stylin' - Lisa Shaw
 Rubiën: "Unknown"—Red Hot Chili Peppers
 Michael: Unknown
New couple: Michael & Saartje

Live Show 2 (October 18, 2009)
Judge panel: Jan Kooijman, Nicky VerNew, Dan Karaty

Results Show 2
Group Choreography:"Smells Like Teen Spirit"—Nirvana (Broadway, choreography by Roberto de Costa and Roy Julen)
Dance for your life couples:
 Louis & Evelien
 Samuel & Suzanne (Samuel eliminated)
 Michael & Saartje (Saartje eliminated)
Solo's:
 Evelien: Unknown
 Louis: Unknown
 Suzanne: 'Say (All I need)' - OneRepublic
 Samuel: Unknown
 Saartje: 'Almost' - Tamia
 Michael: 'The Face' - Ryandan
New couple: Michael & Suzanne

Live Show 3 (October 25, 2009)
Judge panel: Jan Kooijman, Nicky VerNew, Dan Karaty

Results Show 3
Group Choreography:"Bohemian Rhapsody"—Queen (Jazz, choreography by Cora Ringelberg)
Dance for your life couples:
 Bruno & Noi (both eliminated)
 Louis & Evelien
 Michael & Suzanne
Solo's:
 Noi: "Sweet Dreams"—Beyoncé
 Bruno: Unknown
 Evelien: "Slow Me Down" - Emmy Rossum
 Louis: Unknown
 Suzanne: Unknown
 Michael: "Boom Boom Pow"—The Black Eyed Peas
New couple: None

Live Show 4 (November 1, 2009)
Judge panel: Jan Kooijman, Nicky VerNew, Roberto da Costa, Brahim Attaeb

Results Show 4
Group Choreography:"Thriller"—Michael Jackson (Pop, choreography by "Unknown")
Dance for your life couples:
 Louis & Evelien
 Virgil & Saartje (both eliminated)
 Remy & Oona
Solo's:
 Evelien: "Imaginary"—Evanescence
 Louis: "Harder dan ik hebben kan" - BLØF
 Saartje: "Ring The Alarm"—Beyoncé ft. Freemasons
 Virgil: "I Get It In"—Omarion ft. Lil' Wayne
 Oona: "Bamboo Banga"—M.I.A.
 Remy: "Move (If You Wanna)"—Mims
New couple: None

Live Show 5 (November 8, 2009)
Judge panel: Jan Kooijman, Nicky VerNew, Dan Karaty and Jim Bakkum

Results Show 5
Group Choreography:"Stuk Gescheurd"—Notre Dame de Paris (Modern, choreography by Unknown)
Solo's:
 Shiobian: Happy - Leona Lewis
 Michael: I don't wanna miss a thing - Aerosmith
 Oona: Apologize (Instrumentale versie) - OneRepublic
 Louis: When Doves Cry - Prince
 Evelien: The Climb - Miley Cyrus
 Remy: Forever - Chris Brown
 Els: Time of My Life - David Cook
 Kris: 99 Problems - Jay-Z
 Suzanne: Coldest Winter - Kanye West
 Angelo: Got Money - Lil' Wayne feat. T-Pain
 Result: Shiobian and Louis eliminated

Live Show 6 (November 15, 2009)
Judge panel: Jan Kooijman, Nicky VerNew, Dan Karaty and Franscesca Vanthielen

Results Show 6
Group Choreography: "Requiem For A Dream" (theme song) — Clint Mansell (Modern, choreography by Isabelle Beernaert)
Solo's:
 Evelien: Gravity - Sara Bareilles
 Michael: Unknown
 Els: Permanent - David Cook
 Angelo: Hey Mama - Kanye West
 Oona: Eigen compositie
 Remy: This Is It - Michael Jackson
 Suzanne: Unknown
 Kris: Unknown
 Result: Oona and Remy eliminated

Live Show 7 (November 22, 2009)
Judge panel: Jan Kooijman, Nicky VerNew, Dan Karaty and Albert Verlinde

Results Show 7
Group Choreography: Optreden van Pixie Lott - Boys and Girls (Pop, choreography by Roy Julen)
Result: Suzanne and Kris eliminated

Finale (November 29, 2009) 
Judge panel: Jan Kooijman, Nicky VerNew, Dan Karaty 
Group Choreography:  Top 4: "Pink Panther theme remix"— Henry Mancini/Unknown (Hiphop; Choreography: Ish/Roy/Vincent)

Solo's:
 Els: Vole - Céline Dion
 Michael: Beautiful day - U2
 Evelien: Unknown
 Angelo: Radius - Zion I

Results Show Finale
Group Choreography: Top 4 cast, Hairspray: "Mooiste van de stad"—Marcel Visscher as Corny Collins (Broadway; Choreography: Martin Michel)
Eliminated
Evelien Ceulemans
Eliminated
Michael Iongbloed
Battle:

Choreographed Demonstration
Runner-up
Angelo Pardo
Winner:
Els Smekens

External links 
 Official website, vtm (Belgium)
 Official website, RTL (Netherlands)

References

Season 02